Muralee Thummarukudy (born 10 August 1964) is the Chief of Disaster Risk Reduction in the UN Environment Programme. An internationally renowned expert in disaster response, Muralee has been involved in post-disaster response and follow-up of almost all major disasters of the twenty-first century, including the 2004 Indian Ocean earthquake and tsunami, Cyclone Nargis (Myanmar, 2008), Sichuan Earthquake (China, 2008), Haiti Earthquake (2010), Tohoku tsunami (2011) and floods in Thailand (2011). He has completed assignments in Afghanistan, Iraq, Syria, Lebanon, Gaza Strip, Liberia, Sudan and Rwanda dealing with the environmental impacts of conflicts. Also deployed to China, Japan, Myanmar, Ukraine, Haiti, and Thailand to deal with Disasters. He is a native of Vengola in Ernakulam district of the Kerala State in India.

Alma Mater

Before joining the United Nations, Muralee was an Environmental Advisor to the oil companies of Shell Group in South East Asia and Middle-East. He responded to numerous oil spills and oil well fires during this period. He obtained his B.Tech degree from Mar Athanasius College of Engineering, Kothamangalam in Kerala in 1986. He obtained his M.Tech degree from Indian Institute of Technology Kanpur in 1988. He received his Ph.D from Indian Institute of Technology Kanpur in 1993. He has published several books and writes articles in leading Malayalam dailies occasionally. Muralee is a winner of Kerala Sahitya Academi awards 2018 for humorous literature.

Muralee Thummarukudy wrote a facebook post in Malayalam on terrorism which was published in various Malayalam dailies.

Books
 Veendum Chila Naattukaaryangal
 Kazchappadukal 
 Surakshayude padangal 
 Perumazha Pakarnna Padangal
 Budhanum Shankaranum Pinne Njanum

Awards and honors 
 Kerala Sahitya Akademi Award for Humour 2018, for his memoir Chila Naattukaryangal

References

External links 

UN Expert Profile 

1964 births
People from Ernakulam district
United Nations Environment Programme
Living people
Recipients of the Kerala Sahitya Akademi Award